Ajay, also transliterated as Ajai (or ) is an Indian masculine given name originating in Sanskrit  "unconquered", "unsurpassed", "invincible". A related name is Ajit.

People with the name

Arts
 Ajai Sahni, Indian author
 Ajai Sharma, Indian born in India Uttar Pradesh Deoria 
 Ajai Sanders (born 1967), American actress and comedian
 Ajay (actor), Indian actor prominent in Telugu cinema
 Ajay Chabra (born 1970), British actor, director, and producer
 Ajay Devgn (born 1969), Indian actor, director, and producer
 Ajay Devaloka, Indian film editor and director
 Ajay Fry (born 1983), Canadian TV host & personality
 Ajay Gogavale (born 1976), member of Indian musical duo Ajay-Atul
 Ajay Mehta, Indian-American actor
 Ajay Monga (born 1968), Indian writer and film director
 Ajey Nagar (born 1999), Indian YouTuber and streamer
 Ajay Nagrath (born 1986), Indian actor
 Ajay Naidu (born 1972), American actor
 Ajay Navaria (born 1972), Indian author
 Ajay Nayyar (born 1982), British-Indian actor and filmmaker
 Ajay Pohankar (born 1947), Indian vocalist
 Ajay Rao (born 1980), Indian actor
 Ajay Rathnam, Indian actor
 Ajay Rochester (born 1969), Australian actress and author
 Ajay Sastry (born 1974), Indian writer and film director

Business
 Ajai Chowdhry (born 1950), Indian entrepreneur
 Ajay Goyal (born 1965), Indian entrepreneur
 Ajay Kalsi, Indian billionaire
 Mathew Martoma (born 1974 as Ajai Mathew Mariamdani Thomas), American hedge fund portfolio manager, convicted of insider trading
 Ajay Piramal (born 1955), Indian businessman
 Ajay S. Shriram, Indian businessman
 Ajay Tamta (born 1972), Indian politician
 Ajay Vidyasagar (born 1969), Indian TV executive

Politics and government
 Ajay Agarwal, Indian lawyer and politician
 Ajay Bhatt (politician), Indian politician
 Ajay Chakraborty (born 1943), Indian politician
 Ajay Chandrakar (born 1963), Indian politician
 Ajay Chhibber, Indian cabinet minister and UN official
 Ajay Daby (born 1955), Mauritian politician
 Ajay Dutt (born 1976), Indian politician
 Ajay Kapoor (politician) (born 1967), Indian politician
 Ajay Kumar (civil servant) (born 1962), Indian Administrative Service officer and current Defence Production Secretary of India
 Ajay Kumar Mishra (born 1960), Indian politician
 Ajay Maken (born 1964), Indian politician
 Ajai Malhotra (born 1953), Indian diplomat
 Ajay Maroo (born 1958), Indian politician
 Ajay Nishad (born 1966), Indian politician
 Ajay Rai, Indian politician
 Ajay Sancheti (born 1965), Indian politician
 Ajai Singh (born 1935), Indian governor
 Ajay Singh Chautala (born 1961), Indian politician
 Ajay Singh Yadav (born 1958), Indian politician

Science and medicine
 Ajay Bhatt (born 1957), Indian-American computer architect
 Ajay K. Sood (born 1951), Indian physicist
 Ajay Kakkar, Baron Kakkar (born 1964), British surgeon

Sports
 Ajay Baines (born 1978), Canadian ice hockey player
 Ajay Chavan (born 1977), Indian cricketer
 Ajay Dubé (born 1960), Canadian Olympic field hockey player
 Ajay Jadeja (born 1971), Indian cricketer
 Ajay Jayaram (born 1987), Indian badminton player
 Ajay Khabra (born 1995), Canadian soccer player
 Ajay Lalcheta (born 1983), Omani cricketer
 Ajay Ratra (born 1981), Indian cricketer
 Ajay Sharma (born 1964), Indian cricketer
 Ajay Thakur (born 1986), Indian kabaddi player
 Ajay Varma (Bengal cricketer) (born 26 December 1963)
 Ajay Varma (Kerala cricketer) (born 18 February 1963)

Others
 Ajai Shukla, Indian Army officer and journalist
 Ajay Ahuja (1963–1999), Indian Air Force officer
 Ajay Gudavarthy, Indian political theorist, analyst, and columnist
 Ajay Kumar (disambiguation), several people
 Ajai Lall, Indian missionary
 Ajay Singh (disambiguation), several people
 Ajay Skaria, American academic

Fictional characters
 Ajay Ghale, protagonist of the video game Far Cry 4
 Ajay Kapoor (Neighbours), from the Australian soap opera Neighbours
 Ajay Sidhu, from The Lost World: Jurassic Park
 Ajay Bains, from Postman Pat

See also
 AJ (disambiguation)
 Ajay (disambiguation)

References

Indian masculine given names